Wonders may refer to:

 Wonders of the World, spectacular man-made constructions and natural things in the world
 Signs and Wonders, a phrase associated with groups that are a part of modern charismatic movements and Pentecostalism 
 Nevada Wonders, an American soccer team
 Samuel D. Wonders (1890–1980), American engineer
 "Wonders" (song), a 2011 song by The Sound of Arrows
 Wonders (album), a 2014 album by The Piano Guys

See also
 Wonder (disambiguation)
 Wondering (disambiguation)